is a railway station on the Minobu Line of Central Japan Railway Company (JR Central) located in the city of Fujinomiya, Shizuoka Prefecture, Japan.

Lines
Nishi-Fujinomiya Station is served by the Minobu Line and is located 11.9 kilometers from the southern terminus of the line at Fuji Station.

Layout
Nishi-Fujinomiya Station consists of a single island platform serving two tracks, with a third track on a headshunt to permit passage of express trains. The station is attended.

Platforms

Adjacent stations

History
It came under control of the Japanese Government Railways (JGR) on May 1, 1941, and on October 1, 1942, its name was changed to the present name. The JGR became the JNR (Japan National Railway) after World War II. Along with the division and privatization of JNR on April 1, 1987, the station came under the control and operation of the Central Japan Railway Company. Services by the limited express Fujikawa ceased from October 1, 1995.

Station numbering was introduced to the Minobu Line in March 2018; Nishi-Fujinomiya Station was assigned station number CC07.

Passenger statistics
In fiscal 2017, the station was used by an average of 1233 passengers daily (boarding passengers only).

Surrounding area
Fujisan Hongū Sengen Taisha Nishi-Fujinomiya is the station nearest to the Sengen Taisha
Shiraito Falls
Asagiri Plateau
Lake Tanuki

See also
 List of railway stations in Japan

References

External links

   Minobu Line station information 

Railway stations in Japan opened in 1927
Railway stations in Shizuoka Prefecture
Minobu Line
Fujinomiya, Shizuoka